Cantiga de amigo or cantiga d'amigo (Galician-Portuguese spelling), literally "friend song", is a genre of medieval lyric poetry, apparently rooted in a female-voiced song tradition native to the northwest quadrant of the Iberian Peninsula.

According to Rip Cohen, “In 98% of the poems, the speaker is a girl, her mother, the girl’s girlfriend, or a boy (who is given a voice only in dialogues with the girl—which she begins). The girl can speak to any of the other three personae, but they can only address her (there is no directly represented communication between the other three personae: mother, girlfriend and boy do not speak with one another onstage). There are a dozen cantigas with an outside narrative voice, but most of them include words from a girl’s song.” 

Much has been made of nature symbolism in this genre, but “Erotic symbolism, though it has rightly attracted attention […] is not as common as might be imagined. All told, a few dozen poems make use of it (for instance, a rendezvous by the river, spring, or seashore). Far more often sexuality is expressed by code words, like veer (‘see’), falar (‘talk’), and fazer ben (‘do a favour’).” 

What mainly distinguishes the cantiga de amigo is its focus on a world of female-voiced communication. The earliest examples that survive are dated from roughly the 1220s, and nearly all 500 were composed before 1300. Cantigas d'amigo are found mainly in the Cancioneiro Colocci-Brancuti, now in Lisbon's Biblioteca Nacional, and in the Cancioneiro da Vaticana, both copied in Italy at the beginning of the 16th century (possibly around 1525) at the behest of the Italian humanist Angelo Colocci. The seven songs of Martin Codax are also contained, along with music (for all but one text), in the Pergaminho Vindel, probably a mid-13th-century manuscript and unique in all Romance philology.

Stylistically, they are characterized by simple strophic forms, with repetition, variation, and parallelism, and are marked by the use of a refrain (88% of the texts). They constitute the largest body of female-voiced love lyric that has survived from ancient or medieval Europe. There are eighty-eight authors, all male, some of the better known being King Dinis of Portugal (52 songs in this genre), Johan Airas de Santiago (45), Johan Garcia de Guilhade (22), Juião Bolseiro (15), Johan Baveca (13), Pedr' Amigo de Sevilha (10), João Zorro (10), Pero Meogo (9), Bernal de Bonaval (8), Martim Codax (7). Even Mendinho, author of a single song, has been acclaimed as a master poet.

The quantity of situations, although limited, is still higher than in cantigas de amor, and the quantity of speech actions is even higher.

 The girl says goodbye to the boy, or greets him when he is back. She gets angry at him when he leaves without her permission, does not go on a date with her or when she sees him talking to other girls. They argue and then she asks him to return. Sometimes she asks her mother for authorization to go see him, just says that she is going to see him or says that she already did it. Often she narrates, anticipates or does things without talking to any other person.

 The (girl-)friend tries to persuade the girl to be receptive to the boy or forgive him, or sometimes advises her to give up on him. 

 The mother permits or denies the girl's requests to see the boy, or even offers to go with her. She can also give advice after a fight or say "I told you so" when things go wrong.

 The boy (always in dialogue) says goodbye to the girl or greets her when he is back, asks her favours, or begs her for forgiveness.

Although the rhetoric is simpler than of the two other genres, it is more complex than it was often allowed, slowly articulating a present action (or emotion) by repetition with variation, and usually holding important information until the end. There are insults, though lighter compared to the cantigas de escárnio e maldizer. Obscenity and open sexual references are taboo, just like in the cantiga de amor.

The cantiga de amigo have been said to have characteristics in common with the Mozarabic kharajat, but these may be merely coincidences of female speaker and erotic themes.

Types of cantigas
 Tençon is a lyric and satiric cantiga which use dialogue.

Samples
Below are two cantigas d'amigo by Bernal de Bonaval (text from Cohen 2003, tr. Cohen 2010).

See also
 Galician-Portuguese lyric
 Cantigas de escárnio e maldizer
 Cantiga de amor
 Cancioneiro da Ajuda 
 Cancioneiro da Vaticana 
 Cancioneiro Colocci-Brancuti, also known as Cancioneiro da Biblioteca Nacional
 Cantigas de Santa Maria
 Martim Codax
 Occitan literature
 Pergaminho Sharrer
 Galician-Portuguese

References

Bibliography
 
 Mercedes Brea & Pilar Lorenzo Gradín, A Cantiga de Amigo, Vigo: Edicións de Galicia, 1998.
 Rip Cohen, 500 Cantigas d'amigo: A Critical Edition, Porto, Campo das Letras, 2003. https://jscholarship.library.jhu.edu/handle/1774.2/33843
 Rip Cohen, The Cantigas d'amigo: An English Translation. JScholarship, Johns Hopkins University, Baltimore, 2010. https://jscholarship.library.jhu.edu/handle/1774.2/33843)
 Giuseppe Tavani, Trovadores e Jograis: Introdução à poesia medieval galego-portuguesa, Lisbon, Caminho, 2002.
 Peter Dronke, The medieval lyric, Cambridge, D.S. Brewer, 1968.

Western medieval lyric forms
Galician-Portuguese
Portuguese language
Galician language